Ihara (written:  or ) is a Japanese surname. Notable people with the surname include:

, Japanese baseball player and manager
, Japanese politician
, Japanese diplomat
, Japanese rower
, Japanese racing driver
, Japanese footballer
Michio Ihara (born 1928), Japanese sculptor
, Japanese poet and writer
, Japanese actor
 Japanese footballer
, Japanese mathematician

See also
Ihara District, Shizuoka, a former district of Shizuoka Prefecture, Japan
Ihara zeta function
Ihara's lemma

Japanese-language surnames